Twilight Over Burma is a 2015 Austrian biographical film based on the eponymous novel, an autobiography written by Inge Sargent, the Austrian-born consort of Sao Kya Seng, the last saopha of Hsipaw. The film was directed by Sabine Derflinger and produced by Dor Film; it premiered in Austria on October 26, 2015.

Plot
Inge Sargent, an Austrian student and Sao Kya Seng, a young mining student from Burma fall in love. But it is only at the lavish wedding ceremony that Inge discovers her husband is the ruling prince of Hsipaw, a princely state in Burma. After a coup is staged by the Burmese military, Sao is imprisoned. Inge does everything she can to free him.

Cast
Daweerit Chullasapya as Sao Kya Seng
Maria Ehrich as Inge Sargent 
Sahajak Boonthanakit as General Ne Win
Tanapol Chuksrida as Kawlin
Regina Fritsch as Mutter
Kaitlin Orem as Mayari
Jirapat Phanngoen as Bukong
Patrik Plenk as Reisender

Controversy 
In June 2016, the film was hardly banned by the Burmese Motion Picture Classification Board from screening at the Human Rights Human Dignity International Festival in Yangon for purportedly damaging "ethnic unity within the state." The following month, Thailand followed suit; the Thailand International Film Destination Festival canceled a viewing of Twilight Over Burma without explanation, in order to preserve bilateral relations between Thailand and Myanmar.

References

External links 
 

2015 films
2010s German-language films
Austrian biographical drama films